Macroglossum palawana is a moth of the  family Sphingidae. It is known from the  Philippines (Palawan).

References

Macroglossum
Moths described in 2004